This is a list of State Routes in Dauphin County, Pennsylvania. State Routes in Pennsylvania are maintained by the Pennsylvania Department of Transportation. This list incorporates routes numbered between 0001 and 4999 which are either Traffic Routes (Interstate, US, or PA Routes numbered 0001 through 0999) or Quadrant Routes (State Routes numbered 1001 through 4999). For any PA Routes which were relocated after the incorporation of the Location Referencing System in 1987, the old routes were given numbers starting with 6 while the last three digits were the old route number. None exist in Dauphin County. 

As is the case with the other counties in the state, the route numbers start in the northeast quadrant and go clockwise from the 1000s to the 4000s. Odd numbered roads travel south to north, with numbering starting in the north and west of the quadrant. Even numbered roads travel west to east, with numbering starting in the south and west.

The quadrant dividers are not explicitly delineated.

Traffic Routes

Quadrant Routes

1000s

2000s

3000s

4000s

See also

References

 Microsoft Streets & Trips Software
 Official 2004 Dauphin County PennDOT Map

Dauphin